
Wyszków County is a unit of territorial administration and local government (powiat) in Masovian Voivodeship, east-central Poland. It originally existed from 1956 until the abolition of the powiats in 1975, but was re-created on January 1, 1999, as a result of the Polish local government reforms passed in 1998, which reintroduced the powiats and created 16 large voivodeships.

As of 2019 its total population is 74,094, out of which the population of Wyszków is 26,905, and the rural population is 47,189.

Neighbouring counties
Wyszków County is bordered by Ostrołęka County to the north, Ostrów Mazowiecka County to the north-east, Węgrów County to the east, Wołomin County to the south, Legionowo County and Pułtusk County to the west, and Maków County to the north-west.

Administrative division
The county is subdivided into six gminas (one urban-rural and five rural). These are listed in the following table, in descending order of population.

References

 
Land counties of Masovian Voivodeship